Do the A-side is a compilation album from popular Japanese band Do As Infinity, following their announcement to split. It was released on September 28, 2005 and includes every single that they have made. This is the only CD album released from Do As Infinity which does not include any of the band's pictures besides their past CD single covers. There are two versions of this album, one with 2 CDs and a DVD as well as one only containing two CDs. The title of the album is similar to that of the group's 2004 compilation, Do the B-side, which comprises most of the B-side tracks from first seventeen maxi singles they have released.

Track listing

Chart positions

1Do The A side+DVD

External links
 Do the A-side+DVD at Avex Network
 Do the A-side+DVD at Oricon
 Do the A-side at Avex Network
 Do the A-side at Oricon

Do As Infinity albums
2005 compilation albums
2005 video albums
Music video compilation albums
Avex Group compilation albums
Avex Group video albums
Albums produced by Seiji Kameda